Mediastinal shift is the deviation of the mediastinal structures towards one side of the chest cavity, usually seen on chest radiograph. It indicates a severe asymmetry of intrathoracic pressures. Mediastinal shift may be caused by volume expansion on one side of the thorax, volume loss on one side of the thorax, mediastinal masses and vertebral or chest wall abnormalities. An emergent condition classically presenting with mediastinal shift is tension pneumothorax. It is also a useful indicator of malignant pleural effusion.

Mediastinal shift may be detected on antenatal ultrasound in certain fetal conditions.

References

Radiologic signs